USS George Philip (FFG-12), sixth ship of the  of guided-missile frigates, was named for Commander George Philip Jr. (1912–1945), posthumous winner of the Navy Cross for actions as commanding officer of the destroyer .

George Philip was expected to join the Portuguese Navy in 2006, together with her sister ship , but the Portuguese Navy dropped the offer and chose two Dutch s instead. George Philip was expected to join the Turkish Navy in the summer of 2008, together with her sister ship , but the Turkish Navy dropped the offer. As of May 2012, both frigates were awaiting their fates at anchor in the Sinclair Inlet off the Puget Sound Naval Shipyard and Intermediate Maintenance Facility.

Namesake

George Philip Jr. was born on 14 April 1912 in Fort Pierre, South Dakota, to George Philip (18801948), a Scottish immigrant from Morayshire, Scotland and Alice Island "Isle" Waldron (18901972), of part Oglala Lakota descent and also born in Fort Pierre. He was known as Geordie. He attended the South Dakota School of Mines in Rapid City, South Dakota before his appointment to the United States Naval Academy. After completion of the course of instruction at the Naval Academy, he was commissioned an Ensign on 6 June 1935. He continued to progress in grade until his promotion to Commander on 4 September 1944. During this period he served under a variety of commands including:  (1935–37),  (1937–38),  (1938–40),  (1942-43). For his service during the Solomon Islands campaign, Philip was awarded the Silver Star Medal and O'Bannon received the Presidential Unit Citation. He then served with Operational Training Command, Pacific Fleet, San Diego, California (1943–44).

On 16 June 1945 while operating off Okinawa Twiggs was hit by a Japanese kamikaze aircraft. According to eyewitness Chief Machinist's mate Charles F. Schmidt, Commander Philip was last seen mortally wounded, grasping the railing of the bridge trying to stand. Philip and 151 other crewmen were killed or missing when Twiggs sank. He was posthumously awarded the Navy Cross. On 12 March 1946, Secretary of the Navy James Forrestal stated, during the presentation of the Navy Cross to his widow, Margaret Taussig-Philip:

History 
Ordered from Todd Pacific Shipyards, Los Angeles Division, San Pedro, California on 27 February 1976 as part of the FY76 program, George Philip was laid down on 14 December 1977, launched on 16 December 1978, and commissioned on 10 October 1980. Decommissioned on 15 March 2003, as of June 2003 George Philip was in reserve at Naval Inactive Ships Maintenance Facility Bremerton, Washington.

1980s 
George Philip was sponsored by Snow Philip-Simpson, daughter of the ship's namesake, George Philip Jr. at the ship launching on 16 December 1978. George Philip was commissioned 15 November 1980 at Todd Shipyard in San Pedro, California.

From November 1980 to June 1981 George Philip conducted sea trials and testing. In June 1981 the ship received the Battle "E" award for excellence.

From July 1982 to February 1983  George Philip deployed for the first time in support of  battle group. George Philip and her crew were awarded a Battle Effectiveness Award for operations during the 18-month period from 1 January 1982 to 30 June 1983.

From September 1984 to March 1985 the ship was deployed in support of U. S. efforts to keep sea lanes open in the Persian Gulf during the height of the Iran–Iraq War. In June 1985 the frigate transferred to the Naval Reserve Force (NRF). As a member of the NRF, the focus turns to the training and readiness of Selected Reservists. The ship goes from full manning to 60% manning, with the remainder made up of Reservists. From June 1985 to June 1987 engineering and weapons readiness examinations and inspections were performed along with training for helicopter pilots.

George Philip underwent an overhaul at Southwest Marine in San Diego, California from December 1987 to June 1989. While in overhaul the ship received major upgrades in anti-submarine warfare (ASW) capabilities among which, the ship was fitted with a Tactical Towed Array Sonar (TACTASS).

From June 1989 to May 1992 George Philip participated in extensive ASW operations and was used as a test platform for the new ASW equipment.

1990s 
From May to August 1992 George Philip was deployed in support of efforts to counter drug traffic from South America to the United States. In August 1992 the ship began a series of independent operations and port visits that included: San Francisco; Seattle; Vancouver, British Columbia; and Mazatlán, Mexico.

These operations lasted until July 1994 when George Philip deployed in support of efforts to counter drug traffic from South America to the United States. In October 1994 the frigate was escort to the towing of the retired submarine  to Bremerton Naval Station.

George Philip and her crew were awarded a Battle Effectiveness Award for operations in 1994, 1995 and 1996.

In November 1997 the ship participated in the Maritime Combined Operational Training (MARCOT) Exercise in the Northern Pacific. From January to April 1998 George Philip took part in counter-narcotics operations (CNOPS) in the South Pacific.

From March to October 1999 the ship was assigned to the Co-operation Afloat Readiness and Training (CARAT) Deployment.

2000s 
George Philip underwent the Dry-Docking Selected Restricted Availability (DSRA 00) at Continental Marine in San Diego from January to March 2000 In April George Philip transited to Alaska. The frigate conducted port visits to Esquimalt, British Columbia and Juneau, Alaska. On 2–8 October 2000 the ship made a port visit to Ensenada, Mexico.

George Philip was decommissioned on 15 March 2003, as of June 2003 the ship was in reserve at Puget Sound Naval Shipyard and Intermediate Maintenance Facility, Bremerton, Washington.

References

External links 

 MaritimeQuest USS George Philip FFG-12 pages

 

Ships built in Los Angeles
1978 ships
Oliver Hazard Perry-class frigates of the United States Navy
Cold War frigates and destroyer escorts of the United States